Uppsala öd, Old Norse: Uppsala auðr or Uppsala øðr (Uppsala domains or wealth of Uppsala) was the name given to the collection of estates which was the property of the Swedish Crown in medieval Sweden. Its purpose was to finance the Swedish king, originally the "king of Uppsala", and they supported the king and his retinue while he travelled through the country. There was one estate of this kind in most hundreds and it was usually called Husaby. It was the home of the king's tax collector, and it was at the local estate of Uppsala öd that the people of the hundred delivered the taxes in form of goods. The estates were most common in Svealand.

Its origins are prehistoric and unknown, but according to a tradition documented by the thirteenth-century historian Snorri Sturluson it originated as a donation given by the god Freyr to the Temple at Uppsala which he founded.

It was stated in the Swedish medieval laws that Uppsala öd was to follow the royal institution intact without any lost property. The full extent of Uppsala öd is unknown, but individual estates are enumerated in the Law of Hälsingland and in the younger Westrogothic law.

However, during the thirteenth century, the system became obsolete for the king and then many of the estates passed to the nobility and the church, in spite of the laws that forbade any diminution of the property. The reasons for this was that the king's subjects began to pay monetary taxes.

Uppsala öd was the first documented pieces of what would become Swedish State property.

A selection of estates belonging to Uppsala öd
Gamla Uppsala
Husby at Vendel
Fornsigtuna
Husaby
Ränninge on Fogdö
Hovgården on Adelsö

Notes and references

Swedish monarchy
History of Uppsala
Freyr